Karam Javan (also Romanized as Karam Javān; also known as Karīmjavān) is a village in Baruq Rural District, in the Central District of Heris County, East Azerbaijan Province, Iran. At the 2006 census, its population was 695, in 172 families.

References 

Populated places in Heris County